Nikke Colton Plaza is a shopping mall in Moto-Yawata, Ichikawa city, Chiba prefecture, Japan. In addition to shops, the mall has a tennis court, movie theatres, a park, and a fountain.

The Ichikawa Citizen's Library and Chiba Museum of Science and Industry are near Nikke Colton Plaza.

See also
 List of shopping malls in Japan

External links

Colton Plaza official site

Shopping centres in Japan
Buildings and structures in Chiba Prefecture
Ichikawa, Chiba
Shopping malls established in 1988
1988 establishments in Japan